On November 13, 2021, a hacker compromised the FBI's external email system, sending thousands of spam emails warning of a fake cyberattack by cybersecurity researcher and CEO of Night Lion Security and Shadowbyte Vinny Troia, who is falsely labeled in the emails as being a part of The Dark Overlord hacking group by the United States Department of Homeland Security. The emails were sent to addresses taken from the American Registry for Internet Numbers database and it was reported that the hacker used the FBI's public-facing email system which made the emails appear legitimate. The campaign was likely done in an attempt to defame Troia. The hacker "Pompompurin" later claimed responsibility for the hack.

Responses

FBI 
The FBI stated that they remediated the software vulnerablilty that caused the attack. They told people to ignore the email and "confirmed the integrity" of the FBI's computer systems following the attack.

Pompompurin 
The hacker Pompompurin claimed responsibility for attack claiming in an interview with Krebs on Security. In a later interview with ProPublica Pompompurin later claimed the hack was done for "fun."

Vinny Troia 
In a blog post, Vinny Troia claimed that Pompompurin alias belonged to the Canadian hacker Chris Meunier. In an interview with ProPublica, Pompompurin denied being Meunier.

Aftermath 
In March 2023 Pompompurin was arrested on unrelated computer crime charges in Peekskill, New York and was identified as a 20 to 21 year old man named Conor Brian Fitzpatrick. Fitzpatrick was also said to the owner and administrator of the hacker fourm BreachForums that was created a few weeks after the seizure of RaidForums which was a site Fitzpatrick frequented before it's seizure He was identified as connected to the 2021 Robinhood Markets data breach and a data breach of Twitter in 2022.

References 

Federal Bureau of Investigation
Hacking in the 2020s
Email hacking
2021 in computing
November 2021 events in the United States
Spamming
Disinformation operations
Internet trolling